In mathematical physics, inversion transformations are a natural extension of Poincaré transformations to include all conformal, one-to-one transformations on coordinate space-time. They are less studied in physics because, unlike the rotations and translations of Poincaré symmetry, an object cannot be physically transformed by the inversion symmetry. Some physical theories are invariant under this symmetry, in these cases it is what is known as a 'hidden symmetry'. Other hidden symmetries of physics include gauge symmetry and general covariance.

Early use
In 1831 the mathematician Ludwig Immanuel Magnus began to publish on transformations of the plane generated by inversion in a circle of radius R. His work initiated a large body of publications, now called inversive geometry. The most prominently named mathematician became August Ferdinand Möbius once he reduced the planar transformations to complex number arithmetic. In the company of physicists employing the inversion transformation early on was Lord Kelvin, and the association with him leads it to be called the Kelvin transform.

Transformation on coordinates
In the following we shall use imaginary time so that space-time is Euclidean and the equations are simpler. The Poincaré transformations are given by the coordinate transformation on space-time parametrized by the 4-vectors V

Applying this transformation twice on a 4-vector gives a third transformation of the same form. The basic invariant under this transformation is the space-time length given by the distance between two space-time points given by 4-vectors x and y:

These transformations are subgroups of general 1-1 conformal transformations on space-time. It is possible to extend these transformations to include all 1-1 conformal transformations on space-time

We must also have an equivalent condition to the orthogonality condition of the Poincaré transformations:

Because one can divide the top and bottom of the transformation by  we lose no generality by setting  to the unit matrix. We end up with

Applying this transformation twice on a 4-vector gives a transformation of the same form. The new symmetry of 'inversion' is given by the 3-tensor  This symmetry becomes Poincaré symmetry if we set  When  the second condition requires that  is an orthogonal matrix. This transformation is 1-1 meaning that each point is mapped to a unique point only if we theoretically include the points at infinity.

Invariants
The invariants for this symmetry in 4 dimensions is unknown however it is known that the invariant requires a minimum of 4 space-time points. In one dimension, the invariant is the well known cross-ratio from Möbius transformations:

Because the only invariants under this symmetry involve a minimum of 4 points, this symmetry cannot be a symmetry of point particle theory. The symmetry can be a symmetry of a string theory in which the strings are uniquely determined by their endpoints. The propagator for this theory for a string starting at the endpoints  and ending at the endpoints  is a conformal function of the 4-dimensional invariant. A string field in endpoint-string theory is a function over the endpoints.

Physical evidence
Although it is natural to generalize the Poincaré transformations in order to find hidden symmetries in physics and thus narrow down the number of possible theories of high-energy physics, it is difficult to experimentally examine this symmetry as it is not possible to transform an object under this symmetry. The indirect evidence of this symmetry is given by how accurately fundamental theories of physics that are invariant under this symmetry make predictions. Other indirect evidence is whether theories that are invariant under this symmetry lead to contradictions such as giving probabilities greater than 1. So far there has been no direct evidence that the fundamental constituents of the Universe are strings. The symmetry could also be a broken symmetry meaning that although it is a symmetry of physics, the Universe has 'frozen out' in one particular direction so this symmetry is no longer evident.

See also
 Rotation group SO(3)
 Coordinate rotations and reflections
 Spacetime symmetries
 CPT symmetry
 Field (physics)
 superstrings

References

Symmetry
Conservation laws
Functions and mappings